Masoudabad (also Romanized as Masʿūdābād; also known as Maqşūdābād and Maqşūdābād-e Bālā) is a village in Avajiq-e Jonubi Rural District, Dashtaki District, Chaldoran County, West Azerbaijan Province, Iran. At the 2006 census, its population was 48, in 10 families.

References 

Populated places in Chaldoran County